The Catechism Cataclysm is a 2011 independent, psychotronic dark comedy film directed by Todd Rohal. The film's narrative concerns a bumbling priest named Father Billy who embarks on a camping trip with his childhood idol, Robbie.

Cast

Steve Little as Father Billy Smoortser
Robert Longstreet as Robbie Shoemaker
Koko Lanham as Huckleberry Finn
Miki Ann Maddox as Tom Sawyer
Rico A. Comic as Jim
Wally Dalton as Father O'Herlihy
Joe Ivy as Canoe Shop Owner
Judy Findlay as Old Lady
Barbara Pomer as Milagros Maria
Enrique Olguin as Miguel
Jay Wesley Cochran as Depressed Businessman

Release
The Catechism Cataclysm was produced by Rough House Pictures (David Gordon Green, Danny McBride, and Jody Hill). The film was premiered at the 2011 Sundance Film Festival, and subsequently screened within such festivals as Maryland Film Festival.

It was acquired for distribution by IFC Films.

External links
 
 
 

American independent films
2011 films
2011 black comedy films
2011 independent films
American black comedy films
2010s English-language films
2010s American films